Fairfield is an electoral district of the Legislative Assembly of the Australian state of New South Wales in Sydney's West. Fairfield has historically been one of the safest  seats in New South Wales and is considered a part of Labor's heartland in Western Sydney. It is currently represented by Guy Zangari of the Labor Party, although he will not be re-contesting the seat in the 2023 New South Wales state election.

Fairfield includes the suburbs of Carramar, Fairfield, Fairfield East, Fairfield Heights, Guildford West, Old Guildford, Wakeley, Woodpark, Yennora and parts of Canley Vale, Fairfield West, Guildford, Prairiewood, Smithfield and Villawood.

Fairfield was created in 1953.

Demographics
Fairfield is similar to much of Western Sydney in the fact that a significant size of the population were either born overseas or have parents who were born overseas. Approximately 50% of the population which is more than double the Australian average at 22.2% were born overseas of which most were born in either East Asian countries such as Vietnam and China or from Middle Eastern countries like Iraq and Lebanon. Despite this high level of foreign born residents, 83.4% had Australian citizenship which is only slightly lower than the national average of 86.1%. As for languages spoken at home English was the most common language spoken by 29.5%, followed by Vietnamese with 14.5%, Arabic at 11.7% and Assyrian at 6.7%. No other languages were spoken by more than 5% of the population. Catholicism was the most common religion followed by nearly one third of the population at 32.6%. This was followed by Buddhism at 16.7%, Islam at 8.3%, Anglicanism at 8.1% and followers of Eastern Orthodox Christianity at 6.6% of the total population. Median incomes for the population aged 15 years and over was in all 3 categories lower than the national average.

Members for Fairfield

Election results

References

Fairfield
Fairfield
1953 establishments in Australia